Centromere protein K is a protein that in humans is encoded by the CENPK gene.

Interactions 

CENPK has been shown to interact with SOX6.

References

External links

Further reading